Maria Carrillo may refer to:

 Maria Carrillo High School, a public school established in Santa Rosa, California in 1996
 Maria Ygnacia Lopez de Carrillo, grantee of Rancho Cabeza de Santa Rosa, grandmother of California's only Hispanic governor